A tetramer (tetra-, "four" + -mer, "parts") is an oligomer formed from four monomers or subunits. The associated property is called tetramery. An  example from inorganic chemistry is titanium methoxide with the empirical formula Ti(OCH3)4, which is tetrameric in solid state and has the molecular formula Ti4(OCH3)16.  An example from organic chemistry is kobophenol A, a substance that is formed by combining four molecules of resveratrol.

In biochemistry, it similarly refers to a biomolecule formed of four units, that are the same (homotetramer), i.e. as in Concanavalin A or different (heterotetramer), i.e. as in hemoglobin. Hemoglobin has 4 similar sub-units  while immunoglobulins have 2 very different sub-units. The different sub-units may have each their own activity, such as binding biotin in avidin tetramers, or have a common biological property, such as the allosteric binding of oxygen in hemoglobin.

See also
 Cluster chemistry; atomic and molecular clusters
 Tetrameric protein
 Tetramerium, a genus of plants belonging to the family Acanthaceae
 Tetramery (botany), having four parts in a distinct whorl of a plant structure

References

Tetramers (chemistry)